Nsit-Ubium is in the south south of Nigeria and is a Local Government Area of Akwa Ibom State.

History
Nsit Ubium Local Government
Area was carved out of the
then Etinan Local Government
on May 3, 1989, with its
headquarters at Ikot Edibon. In
September 1991, the present
Nsit Ibom Local Government
Area was carved out leaving
Nsit Ubium with its present two
clans — Nsit and Ubium with 65 recognised villages and some other villages which are in existence. It is located
at about 6 km East of Eket,
Okobo, Nsit Ibom, Etinan,
Ibesipko/Asutan and Nsit Atai
Local Government Areas. shears common 
boundary with Nsit Ibom and Eket
Local government It is
well drained by the Qua Ibo
River which has tributaries
scattered in many locations in
the area.
Nsit Ubium covers a land mass
of 242.942 sq kin; and located
6 km East of Eket. The
topography of the Local
Government is undulating with
shallow depressions, dry
valleys and few rivers, which lie
far apart between the
predominant plains. Marshes
and swamps influenced by the
Qua Iboe River traverse a large
portion of the Local
Government Area. Nsit Ubium
is under Uyo Senatorial District in Akwa Ibom North East.

People
Nsit Ubium consists of two Clans —
Nsit and Ubium; with 31 villages in
Nsit clan and 33 in Ubium clan.
Traditionally, the two clans, Nsit and
Ubium, identify themselves along
ethnic lineage. Ubium has three
groups — Ise, Afaha and Ukat, while
Nsit is divided into Ibiakpan, Obotim,
Nduo Eduo and Afia Nsit groups. The
people are generally very hospitable,
knowledgeable and industrious.

Population
Males Females TOTAL:
68,163 60,068 128,231
according to 2006 National Census

References

Local Government Areas in Akwa Ibom State